Prees is a civil parish in Shropshire, England.  It contains 63 listed buildings that are recorded in the National Heritage List for England.  Of these, one is listed at Grade II*, the middle of the three grades, and the others are at Grade II, the lowest grade.  The parish contains the village of Prees, the larger settlement of Prees Higher Heath and smaller settlements including Fauls Green, but is otherwise rural.  Most of the listed buildings are houses, cottages, farmhouses and farm buildings, many of which are timber framed or have timber-framed cores, and some of the earliest have cruck construction.  Various structures associated with these buildings are also listed.  The other listed buildings include two churches, items in the churchyard of the older church, a former watermill, and two milestones and a milepost.


Key

Buildings

References

Citations

Sources

Lists of buildings and structures in Shropshire